The Albion Glacigenic Group is a Quaternary lithostratigraphic group (a sequence of rock strata or other definable geological units) present in those parts of Great Britain which lie north of the southern limit of Anglian glaciation, but south of the Devensian glacial limit, and also includes deposits in the Isle of Man and offshore areas. It consists of a wide range of unconsolidated superficial deposits including till, sands, gravels, silts and clay of glacial, glaciofluvial, glaciolacustrine and glaciomarine origin. Its upper boundary is the present day ground surface or unconformable contact with units of the Caledonia Glacigenic Group, the Britannia Catchments Group or the British Coastal Deposits Group. It was previously known as the South Britain Glacigenic Group or Older Drift

The following subgroups are defined by geographical areas of Great Britain:

 Shetland Glacigenic (Albion) Subgroup
 Western Isles (Albion) Glacigenic Subgroup
 Northwest Highlands (Albion) Glacigenic Subgroup
 Banffshire Coast and Caithness (Albion) Glacigenic Subgroup
 Inverness (Albion) Glacigenic Subgroup
 East Grampian (Albion) Glacigenic Subgroup
 Logie-Buchan (Albion) Glacigenic Subgroup
 Central Grampian (Albion) Glacigenic Subgroup
 Mearns (Albion) Glacigenic Subgroup
 Midland Valley (Albion) Glacigenic Subgroup
 Borders (Albion) Glacigenic Subgroup
 Southern Uplands (Albion) Glacigenic Subgroup
 Irish Sea Coast (Albion) Glacigenic Subgroup
 Manx (Albion) Glacigenic Subgroup
 Central Cumbria (Albion) Glacigenic Subgroup
 North Pennine (Albion) Glacigenic Subgroup
 North Sea Coast (Albion) Glacigenic Subgroup
 Wales (Albion) Glacigenic Subgroup

References

Quaternary geologic formations
Geology of England
Geology of Scotland
Geology of Wales
Geological groups of the United Kingdom